Spiral valves of Heister are undulating folds or valves in the proximal mucosa of the cystic duct. The cystic duct attaches the gallbladder to the common bile duct.

The spiral valves of Heister are supported by underlying smooth muscle fibers. There is some uncertainty regarding the role of the folds. Historically, physicians believed that their function was to aid in the passage of bile to and from the gallbladder, as well as regulate the degree of gallbladder distension.

The presence of the spiral folds, in combination with the tortuosity of the cystic duct, makes endoscopic cannulation and  catheterization of the cystic duct extremely difficult. Also, the valves of Heister are susceptible to lacerations and were a serious obstacle to the surgical canalization. Thanks to newer technologies, nowadays this procedure is possible. They were named after German anatomist Lorenz Heister (1683–1758).

Imaging
On ultrasound, valve of Heister is echogenic.

References

Further reading

Spiral valves of Heister